Nguyễn Phúc Nguyên (阮福源; 16 August 1563 – 19 November 1635) was an early Nguyễn lord who ruled the southern Vietnam from the city of Phú Xuân (modern-day Huế) from 1613 to 1635. During his rule, the Nguyễn established a city at modern-day Saigon. Later, his refusal to pay tribute to the court in Hanoi sparked the Trịnh–Nguyễn War.

Biography
Nguyễn Phúc Nguyên was the sixth son of Nguyễn Hoàng. Upon the death of his father, Nguyễn Phúc Nguyên took over the rule of the southern provinces of Vietnam. He continued his father's policy of refusing to submit to the authority of the court in Hanoi, dominated at this time by his cousin, Trịnh Tùng. Unlike his father he did not take the title Vuong but instead called himself Nhon Quoc-Cong (roughly Duke of the Southern Provinces).

Encourage foreign trade
Starting as early as 1615, Nguyễn Phúc Nguyên allowed Portuguese merchants to set up a trading post at Faifo (modern-day Hội An). The Nguyễn began to purchase advanced European cannons from the Portuguese and learned something of European ship design. This would help them enormously in later years. As time passed, Faifo became a major trade port for the south-west Pacific where traders in the region came to sell and acquire goods. Chinese, Japanese, Europeans, and South Asians all came to trade at Faifo. Originally the land itself did not have any high value products, nevertheless later on Nguyễn lords established various sugar cane and mullberry plantations for the sole purpose of producing goods for overseas export.  Traders from Japan came all the way to Vietnam because the Ming and the Manchu Emperors forbade trade with Japan. In order to obtain the highly desirable Chinese silks and ceramics, the Japanese had to come to Faifo. Local high quality silk was also one of the primary trade for Japanese merchants, who often purchase whole batches months prior to their annual arrival. The local silk price also reflected any changes in Japanese market. In return, Đàng Trong experienced serious shortage of precious metals like gold and copper which the Japanese had abundance to export, therefore Nguyễn Lords imported massive quantity of Japanese coins, either to circulate or to use in their cannon foundries.

Relation with Cambodia

Vietnamese expansionism to Cambodia

Nguyễn Phúc Nguyên maintained the friendly relation with Cambodia. Around 1620, Nguyễn Phúc Nguyên's daughter (Nguyễn Phúc Ngọc Vạn) married the king of Cambodia, Chey Chettha II (the marriage seems to have been contracted years earlier). As a result of this marriage, the Cambodian King allowed the Nguyễn to establish a small trading and tax post at Prei Nokor what is now Saigon in 1623. Vice versa, Nguyễn clan have to supply the weapon and troops to support Cambodian war against Ayutthaya Kingdom. This settlement was the start of a major expansion by the Vietnamese beyond the borders established by Lê Thánh Tông in 1471.
According to the Italian missionary Christoforo Borri who was staying in Quy Nhơn witness the military support of Nguyễn Phúc Nguyên sent to Cambodia, according to his records (published in 1631):

 Lord Nguyễn Phúc Nguyên sent his military support to his son-in-law Chey Chettha II twice to against Siamese. In 1623, the mission from Nguyễn was dispatched to Oudong, with a lot of treasures and gift to strengthen the relationship between two government and confirm the alliance of Cambodia and Nguyễn. After the negotiation, Chey Chettha II allowed to let them established the trading post which were namely Kas Krobei (Vũng Tàu) and Prei Nokor (Saigon) for taxation. Nguyễn lords can bring their private army to protect the post and their citizens as well as the public security of the city of Prei Nokor

Trịnh–Nguyễn contention

With the death of Trịnh Tùng in 1623 and the new rule of his son, Trịnh Tráng, another formal demand was made by the Court in Hanoi for the Nguyễn to pay tribute. In 1624, Nguyễn Phúc Nguyên formally refused. Three years later, the Royal (Trịnh) army marched south and attacked the Nguyễn.
The first set of battles lasted for four months but the Nguyễn armies were not defeated and Phú Xuân was not taken. The Royal army withdrew north to regroup. The Nguyễn immediately began the building of a massive pair of walls to defend their lands. This pair of walls, just south of the Linh River, eventually grew to a length of 11 miles, stretching from the sea to the mountains. The walls were each 20 feet tall and equipped with many cannons of European design.

In 1633, the Trịnh tried to outflank the walls with an amphibious invasion but the Nguyễn fleet was able to defeat the Royal (Trịnh) fleet at the battle of Nhat-Le.

Death
Nguyễn Phúc Nguyên died in 1635 with the war still going on. Still, the defensive measures he had put in place served the Nguyễn well. Phú Xuân was not taken by the Trịnh until 1774. Further, his defensive success in these first battles is a credit to his ability to attract talented men to his cause and make use of expert military advice, even when it came from another country.

See also
Lê dynasty
List of Vietnamese dynasties

Sources

Encyclopedia of Asian History, Volume 3 (Nguyễn Lords) 1988. Charles Scribner's Sons, New York.

Nguyễn lords
1563 births
1635 deaths